Mill House is a former country house in the parish of Adlington, Cheshire, England.  It is dated 1603, and was built by Sir Uriah Legh, of the Legh family of Adlington, as a dower house.  Alterations were made to it in the middle of the 18th century and in the early 20th century.  It is a timber-framed building with some plastered brick infill; it has a Kerridge stone-slate roof.  The house is recorded in the National Heritage List for England as a designated Grade II* listed building.

See also

Grade II* listed buildings in Cheshire East

References

Country houses in Cheshire
Houses completed in 1603
Timber framed buildings in Cheshire
Grade II* listed buildings in Cheshire
Grade II* listed houses
1603 establishments in England